Cyclononane is an alicyclic  hydrocarbon consisting of a ring of nine carbon atoms. Its molecular formula is C9H18.

References

Cycloalkanes
Nine-membered rings